Rural Retreat is a town in Wythe County, Virginia, United States. The population was 1,483 at the 2010 census.

History
The Kimberling Lutheran Cemetery was listed on the National Register of Historic Places in 1980; the Rural Retreat Depot was listed in 2014.

Geography
According to the United States Census Bureau, the town has a total area of 2.2 square miles (5.8 km2), all land.

Demographics

As of the census of 2000, there were 1,350 people, 570 households, and 399 families living in the town. The population density was 600.6 people per square mile (231.7/km2). There were 629 housing units at an average density of 279.8 per square mile (107.9/km2). The racial makeup of the town was 98.52% White, 0.37% African American, 0.30% Native American, 0.15% Asian, 0.37% from other races, and 0.30% from two or more races. Hispanic or Latino of any race were 0.37% of the population.

There were 570 households, out of which 29.6% had children under the age of 18 living with them, 56.1% were married couples living together, 11.6% had a female householder with no husband present, and 30.0% were non-families. 25.4% of all households were made up of individuals, and 13.2% had someone living alone who was 65 years of age or older. The average household size was 2.37 and the average family size was 2.84.

In the town, the population was spread out, with 22.7% under the age of 18, 9.7% from 18 to 24, 27.7% from 25 to 44, 23.6% from 45 to 64, and 16.3% who were 65 years of age or older. The median age was 38 years. For every 100 females there were 88.8 males. For every 100 females age 18 and over, there were 85.3 males.

The median income for a household in the town was $29,141, and the median income for a family was $41,776. Males had a median income of $27,198 versus $21,128 for females. The per capita income for the town was $15,993. About 7.7% of families and 11.2% of the population were below the poverty line, including 11.8% of those under age 18 and 13.7% of those age 65 or over.

Notable people
Doris Crouse-Mays, labor leader
William N. Doak, third United States Secretary of Labor
Dr. Charles T. Pepper, claimed as namesake of the drink  "Dr Pepper"
Deacon Phillippe, major league baseball pitcher
Pamela Stafford, model, fashion designer and artist

References

External links

Towns in Wythe County, Virginia